Wolves Within is the fourth studio album by American progressive metal band After the Burial. It was released on December 17, 2013 through Sumerian Records, and is the band's last release to feature guitarist Justin Lowe before his departure in June 2015 followed by his death a month later. The song "Virga" features guest vocals from the band's former lead vocalist Nick Wellner.

Track listing

Personnel
After the Burial
 Anthony Notarmaso – lead vocals, vocal production
 Trent Hafdahl – lead guitar, backing vocals, engineering, mixing, mastering, production
 Justin Lowe – rhythm guitar, programming, engineering, mixing, mastering, arranging, vocal mixing, production
 Lerichard "Lee" Foral – bass 
 Dan Carle – drums

Additional musicians
 Nick Wellner – guest vocals on track 6, vocal production

Additional personnel
 Terry Date – mixing, production on track 9
 Daniel Castleman – vocal mixing
 Adam Mott (Outerloop Management) – management
 Amanda Fiore (The Pantheon Agency, US) & Marco Walzel (Avocado Bookings, International) – booking
 Austin Wade (Wade Visual) – artwork
 Daniel McBride (McBride Design) – layout

References

Sumerian Records albums
2013 albums
After the Burial albums